USS Hector (AC-7) was a collier acquired by the United States Navy prior to World War I. She carried coal to those ships still using it as fuel to build up steam for their engines, and continued that service until her wrecking and sinking in 1916.

Construction and career
Hector — the second ship to be so named by the U.S. Navy — was launched on 3 July 1909 by the Maryland Steel Company, Sparrows Point, Maryland and commissioned on 22 October 1909.

She was on special service with the Atlantic Fleet from commissioning through 1913, when she was stationed at Norfolk, Virginia. From there, Hector served as a fuel ship, ferrying freight and fuel up the U.S. East Coast and down to the Caribbean, especially Guantánamo Bay and Santo Domingo.

Sinking of Hector

She was disabled when hatches gave way and her boiler room flooded. The ship was wrecked on a reef off Point Romaine, South Carolina on 14 July 1916, breaking in two and sank three days later.

References

External links
USS Hector (Collier # 7), 1909-1916

Colliers of the United States Navy
Ships built in Sparrows Point, Maryland
Shipwrecks in the Atlantic Ocean
1909 ships
Maritime incidents in 1916